Jennifer Yuh Nelson ( Yuh; born May 7, 1972) is a South Korean-born American story artist, character designer, television director, illustrator, and film director. She is best known for directing the films Kung Fu Panda 2, Kung Fu Panda 3, and The Darkest Minds. Yuh is the first woman to solely direct and the first Asian American to direct a major American animated film, and has been recognized as a commercially successful Asian American director.

She won an Annie Award for Best Storyboarding in an Animated Feature Production for directing the opening for Kung Fu Panda and was the second woman nominated for an Academy Award for Best Animated Feature, for her work on Kung Fu Panda 2. The film proved to be one of the most financially successful films directed by a woman. As a supervisor director for her work on Love, Death & Robots, she won Emmy Awards two consecutive times.

Biography 
Yuh was born in 1972 in South Korea and immigrated to the United States with her parents and two sisters when she was four years old. She started sketching and drawing at a young age, while developing an interest with 80s action movies and anime. Her favorite filmmakers were James Cameron, Ridley Scott, and Katsuhiro Otomo.  Yuh spent her childhood in Lakewood, California, where she enjoyed watching martial arts movies, playing with cars, and drawing. "I have been drawing since age 3 and making movies in my head for almost as long. In fact, drawing for me was a way to express those films when I had no other means of doing so," said Yuh. As a young girl, she would sit at the kitchen table for hours and watch her mother draw, copying her every stroke. As a kid, she would fancy stories with her sisters and was learning to draw to get down those stories. Yuh traces the lineage of her career to those formative family experiences.

Interested in art, Yuh followed her sisters to California State University, Long Beach, where she received a Bachelor of Fine Arts in Illustration. There she got introduced to animation, "When I was in college years later, a veteran storyboard artist came to talk to my class. He showed us how he drew movies for a living. My mind exploded. And that led to a career in animation." Jennifer then followed her sisters into the animation industry, at first working as a cleanup artist at Jetlag Productions, where she worked on various direct-to-video features. Following a brief stint at Hanna-Barbera Productions on The Real Adventures of Jonny Quest for Cartoon Network, she was later hired as a storyboard artist on HBO's Todd McFarlane's Spawn series in 1997.

In 1998, Yuh joined DreamWorks Animation as a storyboard artist, where she worked on Spirit: Stallion of the Cimarron, Sinbad: Legend of the Seven Seas, and Madagascar. As a big fan of martial arts movies, she asked to work on the first Kung Fu Panda film, where she served as head of story and director of the opening hand-drawn dream sequence. After the release of Kung Fu Panda, Jeffrey Katzenberg, DWA's CEO at the time, approached Yuh about directing Kung Fu Panda 2. Although she hadn't expressed interest in directing the sequel to the film, Producer Melissa Cobb stated that she should direct the second one due to her excellent work on the first, to which the rest of the crew supported the decision. The film proved a major critical and international box office success with a worldwide gross of $665.6 million, making it the highest-grossing film ever directed by a woman until director Jennifer Lee's Frozen two years later. She held the record for highest-grossing film by a solo female director until the release of Patty Jenkins' 2017 film Wonder Woman. She eventually became the first woman to be nominated for the Academy Award for Best Animated Feature Film (since 2007's Persepolis) and to win the Annie Award for Best Directing in a Feature Production. Yuh returned to co-direct Kung Fu Panda 3 alongside Alessandro Carloni, which was released in 2016. In July 2016, she was also added as one of the board of Governors by Academy of Motion Picture Arts and Sciences.

In 2016, Yuh announced that would be making her live action directorial debut with an adaptation of Alexandra Bracken's The Darkest Minds for 20th Century Fox. Producer Shawn Levy praised Jennifer for her visual sensibility as well as her natural narrative qualities. She described herself as soft-spoken, contrary to what contemporary directors are often personified as; instead, she used storyboards to help pitch her ideas to Shawn Levy and 21 Laps.

In June 2019, Yuh was hired as supervising director of the second season of the Netflix animated anthology series, Love, Death & Robots.

Filmography

Director
Film

Television

Other credits 
Film

Television

Direct-to-video

Awards and nominations 
 Annie Award for Best Storyboarding in an Animated Feature Production at 36th Annie Awards
 Annie Award for Best Directing in an Animated Feature Production at 39th Annie Awards
 Primetime Emmy Awards for Outstanding Animated Program (For Programming More Than One Hour) at 51st Primetime Emmy Awards
 Primetime Emmy Award for Outstanding Short Form Animated Program at 73rd Primetime Creative Arts Emmy Awards
 Primetime Emmy Award for Outstanding Short Form Animated Program at 74th Primetime Creative Arts Emmy Awards
 Maverick Award at 2011 LA Femme International Film Festival
Academy Award nomination for Best Animated Feature
KoreAm Award for Director of the Year

References

External links 

 
 
 Jennifer Yuh Nelson on the Animation Guild

1972 births
Living people
American film directors of Korean descent
American storyboard artists
American women film directors
American animated film directors
American women animators
Annie Award winners
Artists from California
Background artists
California State University, Long Beach alumni
DreamWorks Animation people
Hanna-Barbera people
Film directors from California
People from Lakewood, California
Primetime Emmy Award winners
South Korean emigrants to the United States
South Korean women film directors
South Korean women animators
South Korean storyboard artists